Armilla may refer to:

 metallic objects :
 Latin name for a bracelet in Antiquity, also applied to Greeks, Celts and other peoples
 Armilla (military decoration), an armband awarded as a medal-equivalent to soldiers of ancient Rome
 Armilla or armill, a medieval arm or wristband, usually an item of liturgical or ceremonial jewellery 
 Armillary sphere
 Armilla, Granada, a Spanish municipality in the Andalusian province of Granada
 Armilla Patrol, the British Royal Navy's permanent presence in the Persian Gulf during the 1980s and 1990s
 Armilla (genus), a flatworm genus in the family Dendrocoelidae